Michael Joseph Brady (April 15, 1887 – December 3, 1972) was an American professional golfer.

Biography
Brady was born in Brighton, Massachusetts, on April 15, 1887.

Brady won nine PGA events between 1916 and 1926. He lost in a three-way playoff to John McDermott in the 1911 U.S. Open. He lost to Walter Hagen in a celebrated playoff in the 1919 U.S. Open at the Brae Burn Country Club. Hagen promptly resigned his club pro job at Oakland Hills Country Club after winning and Oakland Hills promptly hired Brady. Brady subsequently won the 1922 Western Open at Oakland Hills.

Brady died in Dunedin, Florida, at the age of 85.

Professional wins

PGA Tour wins (9)
1916 (1) Massachusetts Open
1917 (2) North and South Open, Kilkare Tournament
1920 (1) Florida East Coast Open
1922 (1) Western Open
1923 (1) Massachusetts Open
1924 (1) Metropolitan Open
1925 (1) Westchester Open
1926 (1) Miami Pro-Am Tournament
Source:

Other wins
1914 Massachusetts Open
1920 Michigan Open

Results in major championships

Note: The Masters Tournament was not yet founded and Brady did not play in The Open Championship.

NYF = Tournament not yet founded
NT = No tournament
CUT = Missed the half-way cut
WD = Withdrew
R32, R16, QF, SF = Round in which player lost in PGA Championship match play 
"T" indicates a tie for a place

Team appearances
France–United States Professional Match (representing the United States): 1913

References

American male golfers
PGA Tour golfers
Golfers from Massachusetts
Sportspeople from Boston
1887 births
1972 deaths